Hailsham Community College is a coeducational all-through school and sixth form with academy status, located in Hailsham, East Sussex, England.  There are currently around 1160 pupils at HCC.
Hailsham Community College has five buildings, a main block, science block, craft block and sixth form block, as well as a sports hall and astro turf. The sports hall is a million pound lottery-funded building which was built in 2006.

The college has a pathway system in which some students are able to take their GCSE exams a year early.

In June 2007 the college was awarded the Healthy Schools Gold standard for its work on students' health and wellbeing.

The college became an academy on 1 August 2012.

Previously a secondary school, in September 2019 Hailsham Community College opened a primary school department and so is now an all-through school.

References

External links

Hailsham Community College VLE

Secondary schools in East Sussex
Academies in East Sussex
Hailsham
Primary schools in East Sussex